Stemmadenine is a terpene indole alkaloid.  Stemmadenine is believed to be formed from preakuammicine by a carbon-carbon bond cleavage.  Cleavage of a second carbon-carbon bond is thought to form dehydrosecodine.  The enzymes forming stemmadenine and using it as a substrate remain unknown to date. It is thought to be intermediate compound in many different biosynthetic pathways such as in Aspidosperma species. Many alkaloids are proposed to be produced through intermediate stemmadenine. Some of them are:
 Catharanthine and Tabersonine in Catharanthus roseus
 Subincanadines D-F in Aspidosperma subincanum
It is also present as product in plant like in Tabernaemontana dichotoma seeds.

Pharmacology  
It has hypotensive and weak muscle relaxant properties.

See also 
Secologanin
Strictosidine

References

Tryptamine alkaloids
Piperidine alkaloids
Heterocyclic compounds with 4 rings
Methyl esters